Antuã is a Portuguese river, located in the Aveiro region. It is the most important tributary of the Ria de Aveiro after the Vouga River. Its name is linked to the former name of Estarreja: Antuão or Anterão. It has its source between Romariz and Fajões, near S. João da Madeira, and it ends west of Estarreja, on the waters of the Ria de Aveiro. The main towns near its banks are S. João da Madeira, Oliveira de Azeméis, and Estarreja. Its main tributary is the Ínsua.

In 2008, an assessment was completed on the river basin for water pollution. There was a recorded disruption of its freshwater system due to microplastics in water and sediments.

References 

Rivers of Portugal